Shahida Qazi (born 1944) is a Pakistani journalist and academic, who was the first woman to be recognised as a correspondent in Pakistan.

In 1963, she was the country's first and only woman to be enrolled in the then-newly established department of journalism at the University of Karachi. Qazi joined Dawn News in 1966 and became the first female reporter in Pakistan. She later worked for the PTV for 18 years. She also served as the chairperson of mass communication at the University of Karachi and the Mohammad Ali Jinnah University.

References 

1944 births
Living people